Aixovall is a village in Andorra, in the parish of Sant Julià de Lòria.

Sport
It is home to Andorra's national football stadium, the Camp d’Esports d’Aixovall. There is also the national vehicle safety testing centre (ITV) where every vehicle over five years old is taken annually for safety tests.

References

Populated places in Andorra
Sant Julià de Lòria
FC Lusitanos